The Believers' Movement for Equality and Peace (MOCEP) is a political party in Togo.

History
In the 2002 parliamentary elections the party won one of the 81 seats in the National Assembly. It lost its seat in the 2007 parliamentary elections, when it received just 0.07% of the vote.

References

Political parties in Togo